Voltaire is the given name of:

 Voltaire Volly De Faut (1904–1973), American jazz reed player
 Voltaire Gazmin (born 1944), 40th commander of the Philippine Army, lieutenant general, and Secretary of National Defense of the Republic of the Philippines
 Voltaire Molesworth (1890–1934), Australian politician
 Voltaire P. Twombly (1842–1918), American Civil War recipient of the Medal of Honor